One meaning of system console, computer console, root console, operator's console, or simply console is the text entry and display device for system administration messages, particularly those from the BIOS or boot loader, the kernel, from the init system and from the system logger. It is a physical device consisting of a keyboard and a screen, and traditionally is a text terminal, but may also be a graphical terminal. System consoles are generalized to computer terminals, which are abstracted respectively by virtual consoles and terminal emulators. Today communication with system consoles is generally done abstractly, via the standard streams (stdin, stdout, and stderr), but there may be system-specific interfaces, for example those used by the system kernel.

Another, older, meaning of system console, computer console, hardware console, operator's console or simply console is a hardware component used by an operator to control the hardware, typically some combination of front panel, keyboard/printer and keyboard/display.

History

Prior to the development of alphanumeric CRT system consoles, some computers such as the IBM 1620 had console typewriters and front panels while the very first programmable computer, the Manchester Baby, used a combination of electromechanical switches and a CRT to provide console functions—the CRT displaying memory contents in binary by mirroring the machine's Williams-Kilburn tube CRT-based RAM.

Some early operating systems supported either a single keyboard/print or keyboard/display device for controlling the OS. Some also supported a single alternate console, and some supported a hardcopy console for retaining a record of commands, responses and other console messages. However, in the late 1960s it became common for operating systems to support many more consoles than 3, and operating systems began appearing in which the console was simply any terminal with a privileged user logged on.

On early minicomputers, the console was a serial console, an RS-232 serial link to a terminal such as a ASR-33 or later a DECWriter or DEC VT100. This terminal was usually kept in a secured room since it could be used for certain privileged functions such as halting the system or selecting which media to boot from. Large midrange systems, e.g. those from Sun Microsystems, Hewlett-Packard and IBM, still use serial consoles. In larger installations, the console ports are attached to multiplexers or network-connected multiport serial servers that let an operator connect a terminal to any of the attached servers. Today, serial consoles are often used for accessing headless systems, usually with a terminal emulator running on a laptop. Also, routers, enterprise  network switches and other telecommunication equipment have RS-232 serial console ports.

On PCs and workstations, the computer's attached keyboard and monitor have the equivalent function.  Since the monitor cable carries video signals, it cannot be extended very far. Often, installations with many servers therefore use keyboard/video multiplexers (KVM switches) and possibly video amplifiers to centralize console access. In recent years, KVM/IP devices have become available that allow a remote computer to view the video output and send keyboard input via any TCP/IP network and therefore the Internet.

Some PC BIOSes, especially in servers, also support serial consoles, giving access to the BIOS through a serial port so that the simpler and cheaper serial console infrastructure can be used. Even where BIOS support is lacking, some operating systems, e.g. FreeBSD and Linux, can be configured for serial console operation either during bootup, or after startup.

Starting with the IBM 9672, IBM large systems have used a Hardware Management Console (HMC), consisting of a PC and a specialized application, instead of a 3270 or serial link. Other IBM product lines also use an HMC, e.g.,  System p.

It is usually possible to log in from the console. Depending on configuration, the operating system may treat a login session from the console as being more trustworthy than a login session from other sources.

See also
Command-line interface (CLI)
Console application
Console server
Linux console
Virtual console
Windows Console

References

External links

BIOS
Computer systems
Computer terminals
Out-of-band management
Console
User interfaces
System console

ru:Консоль#Программное обеспечение